Qat may refer to:

 Khat or qat, a flowering plant
 Qat (deity), a deity of northern Vanuatu
 QAT, ISO 3166-1 alpha-3 code for Qatar
 Microsoft Office Quick Access Toolbar
 Intel QuickAssist Technology for cryptography and compression

See also
 The Qat Collection, a 1994 album by Sasha